"This Summer's Gonna Hurt like a Motherfucker" (also known as "This Summer's Gonna Hurt..." or titled "This Summer" or "This Summer's Gonna Hurt like a Motherf***er" of for its single release) is a song performed by American pop rock band Maroon 5. The fourth single from the album, it followed the reissue deluxe edition of the band's fifth studio album V, on May 15, 2015. Musically, the song has been described as having a "synthpop sound", while incorporating an arena rock style.

Background 
On May 6, 2015, it was rumored that Maroon 5 were to release a brand new single titled "This Summer's Gonna Hurt" on May 26, 2015, to radio airplay. The following day, it was confirmed by Billboard magazine in an article stating that "This Summer's Gonna Hurt" would be released ahead of the band's upcoming reissue deluxe of their album V (2014) and will follow to the band's previous single "Sugar". On May 11, 2015, the band officially announced that the single would be released on May 15, and on mainstream radio May 19, 2015.

Chart performance 
During the May 17–23 tracking week, "This Summer's Gonna Hurt" received approximately 4,216 pop radio spins. That earned it the number 22 position on Mediabase's official pop radio airplay chart. The following week, "Summer" leveraged only two days of airplay to debut at number 35 on the official pop chart. "This Summer's Gonna Hurt" also reached the top 25 at hot adult contemporary radio. After debuting at number 44, the song jumped to number 23 on its second week, after receiving 1,457 tracking week spins. After peaking at number 23, the song became the band's first official single release in five years to miss the top 10 of the Billboard Hot 100.

Music video

Background 
The official music video for the song was filmed during a live concert at SSE Arena Wembley on May 28, 2015 and was shot in black-and-white. It was directed by Travis Schneider and Adam Levine. According to Schneider, the video was inspired by the music videos, "I Want Love" by Elton John and "Queer" by Garbage.

The video for the song was released without promo on May 30, 2015. In the video there is a scene where Levine's buttocks are fully exposed. Because of this in the video there is a content warning and the requirement that viewers sign in (to verify their age). It was eventually released on the band's YouTube channel on June 2, without the content. A clean version of the video was released on June 12, 2015. While most of the scene are retained from the original music video, the scenes about nudity, kissing and his mouth speaking profanity has been covered by different emojis, while the word "fucker" has been replaced by "AHA" instead of bleeping the sounds.

Synopsis 

The video starts with Adam Levine coming out of the bathroom and going to the cloakroom. After dressing up there, he starts to walk in the corridor. He takes to the stage where the audience greets him and the group performs the song live. When the performance ends the group members descend the stage and go to sit in their cars to go.

Reception 
The music video was received with positive response from most critics. Daniel Kreps of Rolling Stone wrote humorously that the video is revealing for two reasons; "First, it offers a candid look at life on tour through the eyes of Adam Levine as the viewer journeys with the singer from the dressing room to backstage to the edge of the catwalk at a massive arena. Secondly, the video is revealing because Levine flashes some unexpected nudity". Vimal Esvaren of The Record Blog explained: "Another run-of-the-mill concert video, it is told from the perspective of frontman Levine as he leaves the shower, gets ready, goes on stage, performs and gets in a car out of the stadium with the rest of his bandmates. And in between all that he moons viewers for the extra shock factor".

Circuit Jerks video 
A music video for the song's remix version performed by Circuit Jerks and created by Kidmograph. The video was released on July 31, 2015, by Samsung and later YouTube on January 25, 2016. The version was also appeared on the group's EP titled EP1 (2016).

Live performances 
On May 19, 2015, Maroon 5 performed a clean version of the song during the finale of the eighth season of The Voice. Afterwards, the band also performed with the song as an encore for their worldwide concert tour, the Maroon V Tour.

Track listing 

CD Single
 "This Summer's Gonna Hurt like a Motherfucker" ― 3:44
 "Sugar (Remix)" ― 3:55
Digital download
 "This Summer's Gonna Hurt like a Motherfucker" – 3:44

Digital download – Clean
 "This Summer" (Clean) – 3:44
Digital download – Circuit Jerks Remix
 "This Summer" (Circuit Jerks Remix) – 3:54

Credits and personnel 
All credits adapted from the liner notes.
Maroon 5
 Adam Levine – lead vocals, songwriting
 Jesse Carmichael – keyboards, synthesizers, rhythm guitar, backing and gang vocals
 Mickey Madden – bass
 James Valentine – lead guitar, backing and gang vocals
 Matt Flynn – drums, percussion
 PJ Morton – keyboards, synthesizers, piano, backing and gang vocals
Session musicians 
 Shellback – songwriting, producer, programming, additional guitar, bass, keyboards, gang vocals
 Sam Farrar – gang vocals

Additional personal
 Noah "Mailbox" Passovoy – engineer
 Sam Holland – assistant engineer
 Corey Bice – assistant engineer
 Emerson Day – assistant engineer
 Ben Sedano – assistant engineer
 Serban Ghenea – mixer
 John Hanes – engineered for mix
 Tim Roberts – assistant engineered for mix
 Tom Coyne – mastering

Recording
 Recorded at: MXM Studios, Stockholm, Sweden, and at Conway Studios and Henson Studios, Los Angeles, California
 Mixed by at MixStar Studios, Virginia Beach, Virginia, United States
 Mastered at Sterling Sound, New York City, New York, United States

Charts

Weekly charts

Year-end charts

Certifications

Release history

Maroon 5 vs. Alesso version 

A progressive house version of the song remixed by Swedish producer Alesso, was released on June 29, 2015 on iTunes. The version which was credited as Maroon 5 vs. Alesso.

Background 
Alesso explained:  Adam Levine also explained about the collaboration of Alesso:

Live performances 
On June 20, 2015, Alesso debut the version for the first time at EDC festival in Las Vegas, Nevada. On July 24, 2015, Alesso performed the remix at the Tomorrowland festival in Boom, Belgium.

Track listing 
 Digital download
 "This Summer" (Maroon 5 vs. Alesso) – 3:11
 "This Summer" (Maroon 5 vs. Alesso) (Extended Mix) - 5:04
 Digital download — Clean
 "This Summer" (Maroon 5 vs. Alesso) (Clean) – 3:11

Release history

References 

2015 singles
2015 songs
222 Records singles
Interscope Records singles
Maroon 5 songs
Songs written by Adam Levine
Songs written by Shellback (record producer)
Song recordings produced by Shellback (record producer)
Black-and-white music videos
American synth-pop songs
Song recordings produced by Alesso